HDPE pipe is a type of flexible plastic pipe used for fluid and gas transfer and is often used to replace ageing concrete or steel mains pipelines. Made from the thermoplastic HDPE (high-density polyethylene), its high level of impermeability and strong molecular bond make it suitable for high pressure pipelines. HDPE pipe is used across the globe for applications such as water mains, gas mains, sewer mains, slurry transfer lines, rural irrigation, fire system supply lines, electrical and communications conduit, and stormwater and drainage pipes.

Benefits 
The toughness and resistance to chemicals of polyethylene, as well as the corrosion resistance and low weight have contributed to its growing use in situations where cost-effective and durable fluid and gas piping systems are required. According to a press release from the Plastics Pipe Institute, "PE piping has been used for water and other fluids in Europe and America since the 1950s due to its durability, leak free joints, resistance to corrosion, and long-term cost-effectiveness." 

HDPE pipe can be joined by butt welding, electrofusion welding, socket welding, or extrusion welding. These joints heat the pipe during the joining process, creating a completely homogeneous joint so the weld becomes as strong, or stronger than the existing pipe on either side of the weld. There is no need to use rubber seals or jointing chemicals, as is used for joining PVC pipe, which cause environmental health issues and increase the chance of failure over time. PE is less likely to have problems with root intrusion, and provides integrity for the pipeline, even when installed in unstable soils.

Due to the fusion welding system, the need for anchors or thrust restraint blocks are eliminated, as the joints become fully end load resistant, reducing costs for material and installation time. This also allows for safer excavation close to the pipeline in future, which is particularly important for high pressure gas pipelines. Coils of PE Pipe make trench-less installation safer and less intrusive on the surrounding environment.

HDPE pipe systems are available for many applications, providing for standard trenching of water mains, fire ring mains, sewer mains, and gas mains pipelines, as well as horizontal drilling for electrical and telecommunications conduits. According to a company that manufactures HDPE, HDPE systems are cost-effective to install and have long-term maintenance cost savings, and also allow for cheaper installation methods, such as HDD (horizontal directional drilling), sliplining, pipe bursting, floating and submerged pipe.

HDPE pipe is very durable and flexible and can be bent on site to a radius twenty-five times the nominal pipe diameter - for SDR11 and SDR17 pipe, at or below 20°C ambient temperature. This provides major cost savings, when compared to different pipe systems, some of which require glued fittings, restraints or thrust blocks for even minor changes in direction. Because of the high impact resistance and flexibility of HDPE pipe, it is well suited to installation in dynamic soils including in earthquake-prone areas. HDPE pipe has very high flow capacity, because of its smooth bore and end-to-end jointing methods. HDPE pipe does not corrode in the environment, and will maintain its flow capabilities over time, unlike ferrous piping systems, which will rust and build up internal resistance to fluid flowing through it.

Because food-grade polyethylene virgin material is used to fabricate HDPE pipes, they are safe for the transfer of drinking water, provided that any initial debris has been flushed out. HDPE pipe is resistant to many chemicals, facilitating its use in process plants or around corrosive or acidic environments, without needing to use protective coatings or galvanising, as is required on steel pipes. As HDPE has a very low thermal conductivity, it can maintain more uniform temperatures compared to metal pipes when carrying fluids, which will greatly reduce any need for insulation to control condensation around the pipeline.

Manufacture 
To make pipe lengths, HDPE resin is heated and extruded through a die, which determines the diameter of the pipeline. The wall thickness of the pipe is determined by a combination of the size of the die, speed of the screw and the speed of the haul-off tractor. Polyethylene pipe is usually black in color due to the addition of 3-5% of carbon black being added to the clear polyethylene material. The addition of carbon black creates a product which is UV light resistant. Other colours are available but are less common. Coloured or striped HDPE pipe is usually 90-95% black material, with just a coloured skin or stripe on the outside 5%.

The following shows the process for HDPE Pipe Extrusion:

Polyethylene raw material is pulled from a silo, into the hopper dryer, which removes any moisture from the pellets. Then it is pulled by a vacuum pump into the blender, where it is heated by a barrel heater. After coming through the die, the newly formed pipe quickly enters the cooling tanks, which submerge or spray water at the pipe exterior, each one reducing the temperature of the pipe by 10-20 degrees. Because polyethylene has a high specific heat capacity, the pipe must be cooled in stages, to avoid deforming the shape, and by the time it reaches the "haul-off tractor", it is hard enough to be gently pulled by the 2-3 belts. A laser or powder printer prints the size, type, date and manufacturers name on the side of the pipe.

A different die is used for striped HDPE pipe, which has small channels that the coloured material runs through, just before it is pushed through the die. This means the stripes are formed as an integral part of the pipe and are not likely to separate from the main pipe body. Co-extruded, or co-ex HDPE pipe, has a second extrusion screw which adds an extra skin of colour around the black HDPE pipe, this allows the pipe to be coloured on the outside, for identification or thermal cooling requirements.

Uses 
The HDPE pipeline is being released into the ocean to clean up the Great Pacific Garbage Patch.

HDPE pipe has been used in rural and mining environments in Australia for over 50 years, proving to be a very durable and effective means of fluid and gas transfer.

Life expectancy 

Although HDPE pipe is often estimated to last 50 years, they are in fact more likely to have life expectancies of 100 years. PIPA (Plastics Industry Pipe Association) and the Plastic Pipe Institute (PPI) have written technical white papers on HDPE design life. The PIPA paper is called "Life Expectancy for Plastics Pipes" which mentions that because of the fifty-year stress regression data, people  falsely assume that plastic pipe systems' life expectancy is only fifty years. In fact, these pipe systems can be reasonably expected to last up to or more than 100 years. In Australia, PE pipes and PE fittings were introduced during the mid-1900s, mainly for irrigation or water supply, but also for gas, fuel, and other industrial applications. The use of this 50-year time interval, leads to a misunderstanding that it represents a 50-year pipe life. For pipe systems that have been correctly manufactured and installed, the actual life cannot be predicted, but can be expected to be over 100 years until major rehabilitation is needed.

References

Piping